Paul Martens (born 26 October 1983) is a German former professional road bicycle racer, who rode professionally between 2006 and 2021.

Career

Amateur years
Martens started racing junior level events in 2000 showing no particular specialization finishing in the middle of the pack in the Niedersachsen Juniors and Cottbuser Juniors races. In 2001 he started to show some form finishing 3rd in Stage 1 of LVM Saarland Trofeo beating the chasing peloton by 2 seconds. Later in the year he finished 10th overall at the Münsterland Tour Juniors a race he would win the senior version of later in his career. In 2002 he rode the Istrian Spring Trophy finishing 56th overall with his best result coming in the stage 3 sprint where he finished 16th. In late May 2002 he rode the Under-23 Tour de Berlin where he finished 13th overall but was the first rider born in 183 or later so he won the Youth classification. 2003 started with winning the Rund um Sebnitz in Germany. The only other notable event in 2003 was a podium placing on Stage 1 of the under-23 tour de Berlin. 2004 saw Martens get second at the German National Time Trial Championships in the Under-23 competition. Later in the season he compteted in the Under-23 European and World time trial championships he finished 13th in both events. Martens signed for amateur team KED Bianchi Team Berlin for the 2005 season, this gave him a calendar with more UCI races over the year. He started the year with a win at the national event; Harzrundfahrt. Followed by 5th in the Stage 1 sprint of Circuit des Ardennes. Then a win at the Under-23 German National Time Trial Championships. For the later part of the 2005 season he was a stagiaire at UCI ProTeam .

Skil – Shimano (2006 to 2007)

2006
In November 2005  announced they had signed Martens to their team on a two-year contract. Martens Pro career began in Qatar with the International Grand Prix Doha where he finished in 126th position the second to last finisher nearly 4' 30" down on the winner. It was then onto a few stage races where he played the domestique role. The next races on his calendar were the Cobbled classics leading into the Ardennes classics. Martens rode his only ever Tour of Flanders where he didn't finish and his only Paris–Roubaix where he came 99th  almost 20 minuted down. The first show of form was at the Rheinland-Pfalz Rundfahrt where he finished top-10 in two stages followed by a top 10 in Stage 4 of Tour de Picardie later in the month. The Tour de Luxembourg brought Martens first professional win, winning Stage 3 ahead of eventual overall winner Christian Vande Velde. Martens second professional win came at the Münsterland Giro where he took the early break away and held the peloton off finishing two seconds ahead of them on line.

2007
Martens started 2007 at the Vuelta a Andalucía where he finished 6th in the bunch sprint of stage 2 and ended 21st overall after the 5 stages. It was then to Belgium for the Cobbled Classics where he didn't finish Nokere Koerse or Omloop Het Volk but came third in the Grand Prix Rudy Dhaenens. The first top-10 result in a stage race came at the final edition of Rheinland-Pfalz Rundfahrt where Martens finished 4th in Stage 3 and then 2nd in Stage 4 to finish 5th overall 16 seconds down on the winner. In June 2007 the Tour de Luxembourg was held with Martens finishing in the top-10 in 3 stages and only losing 17 seconds in the prologue. This led to him finishing 4th overall 25 seconds down on the winner. Stage 3 of the Ster Elektrotoer was won by Martens from a reduced bunch sprint after a hilly battle. This put himself into the leaders jersey only to lose the lead the next day and finish second overall. In August he raced the Rund um die Hainleite where he came third in another reduced bunch sprint. His last major result came at the Eneco Tour where he finished 9th overall. On 24 October 2007 Martens announced he would ride for UCI ProTeam  from 2008 on a two-year contract, saying his three professional wins in two years at Skil Shimano were impressive.

Rabobank (2008 to 2021)
He competed in the 2015 Tour de France.

In February 2020, Martens announced that he would retire from cycling at the end of the season; however, due to the COVID-19 pandemic, Martens intended to prolong his career until the middle of the 2021 season. He retired following the 2021 Giro d'Italia, where he finished 99th.

Major results
Sources:

2001
 1st  Madison (with Florian Piper), National Junior Road Championships
 10th Overall Münsterland Tour Juniors
2002
 1st  Youth classification Tour de Berlin U23
2003
 1st Rund um Sebnitz
2004
 2nd Time trial, National Under-23 Road Championships
2005
 1st  Time trial, National Under-23 Road Championships
 1st Harzrundfahrt
2006
 1st Münsterland Giro
 1st Stage 2 Tour de Luxembourg
2007
 2nd Overall Ster Elektrotoer
1st Stage 2
 3rd Rund um die Hainleite
 3rd Grand Prix Rudy Dhaenens
 4th Overall Tour de Luxembourg
 5th Overall Rheinland-Pfalz Rundfahrt
 9th Overall Eneco Tour
2008
 6th Overall Ster Elektrotoer
 6th Overall Regio-Tour
 8th Overall Sachsen Tour
 10th Coppa Sabatini
2009
 3rd GP Ouest–France
 5th Eschborn–Frankfurt City Loop
 6th Giro del Piemonte
 8th Overall Sachsen Tour
2010
 1st Grand Prix de Wallonie
 4th Brabantse Pijl
 4th Paris–Brussels
 4th Gran Premio Bruno Beghelli
 6th Grote Prijs Jef Scherens
 8th E3 Prijs Vlaanderen
2011
 10th Amstel Gold Race
 10th La Flèche Wallonne
2012
 1st Stage 4 Vuelta a Burgos
2013
 1st  Overall Tour de Luxembourg
 1st Stage 1 Volta ao Algarve
 3rd Volta Limburg Classic
 5th Overall Arctic Race of Norway
 9th Overall Tour de Wallonie
2014
 1st Stage 5 Tour of Belgium
 2nd Ronde van Limburg
 4th Overall Ster ZLM Toer
2015
 10th Overall Tour du Poitou-Charentes
2017
 5th Volta Limburg Classic
 10th Cadel Evans Great Ocean Road Race
2019
 1st Stage 1 (TTT) UAE Tour

Grand Tour general classification results timeline

References

External links

 

1983 births
Living people
German male cyclists
Sportspeople from Rostock
People from Bezirk Rostock
Cyclists from Mecklenburg-Western Pomerania
21st-century German people